Doyal Township is an inactive township in St. Clair County, in the U.S. state of Missouri.

Doyal Township was erected in 1872, taking its name from H. L. M. Doyal, an early settler.

References

Townships in Missouri
Townships in St. Clair County, Missouri